Susanne Merethe Lundeng (born 18 August 1969 in Bodø, Norway) is a Norwegian traditional folk musician (fiddle) and composer.

Career 
Lundeng had Arvid Engegård as violin teacher and is a prominent practitioner of north Norwegian folk music. She has collaborated with Halvdan Sivertsen and later Sinikka Langeland (2005), among others. In the Midnight Sun Trio she collaborates with Knut Erik Sundquist (bass) and Arvid Engegård (violin). Within S.L. Band she collaborated with Bjørn Andor Drage (piano), Håvar Bendiksen (guitar and accordion), Trond-Viggo Solås (bass) and Arnfinn Bergrabb (percussion). Lundeng got in contact with old fiddlers in Salten, Lofoten at an early stage and she has undoubtedly contributed to the preservation of the Nordland traditional folk heritage.

From the start Lundeng primarily was a promoter of traditional folk music from Nordland, she has over the years shifted more to perform the music she makes herself. But still she has the core of the Nordland folk music in most of what she writes. At the same time she gets inspiration both from jazz, contemporary and folk traditions from other countries.

Discography

Solo albums 
1991: Havella(Heilo), slåtter from Nordland
1994: Drag (Kirkelig Kulturverksted)
1997: Ættesyn (Kirkelig Kulturverksted), with some of her own compositions and traditional folk music from Nordland
2000: Vals Til Den Røde Fela (Kirkelig Kulturverksted), with her own compositions
2004: Forunderlig Ferd (Kirkelig Kulturverksted), with her own compositions as well as some traditional works
2006: Nattevåk (Kirkelig Kulturverksted), with her own compositions
2011: Mot (Kirkelig Kulturverksted), with her own compositions as well as the contemporary works "Imella" by Rolf Wallin
2015: Nordalsslotter - Hilsen Susanne Lundeng (Havella Records)

Collaborations 
1994: Sweet Sunny North: Henry Kaiser And David Lindley In Norway (Shanachie)
1996: Sweet Sunny North, Vol. 2 (Shanachie)
1996: Norske Turdansar II, frå Agder og Nord-Norge (Heilo), with Ånon-Egeland
2004: Aejlies Gaaltije (Vuelie), with Frode Fjellheim
2011: Rolf Wallin: Wire and String (Simax Classics)
2013: Flåte (Norway Music), with Hammer & Hersk (Arild Hammero & Daniel Herskedal)

Honors

References

External links 

Susanne Lundeng Biography at NRK fylkesleksikon (in Norwegian)

1969 births
Living people
Musicians from Bodø
Norwegian fiddlers
Norwegian composers
21st-century violinists